Eddie Odhiambo-Anaclet (born 31 August 1985) is a Tanzanian former professional footballer who played as a defender. He was most recently manager of  side North Leigh.

Odhiambo began his career as a schoolboy with Oxford United, before moving to Southampton in 2003. A year later, he signed on professional terms with the club, and was loaned out on separate occasions to Chester City and Tamworth during the 2004–05 season. He did not break into the first-team at Southampton, and signed for Oxford United on a free transfer in July 2006. After two seasons of regular first-team football at Oxford, he joined Stevenage Borough on a free transfer ahead of the 2008–09 campaign. In his first season with the Hertfordshire side, he helped the club win the FA Trophy in May 2009. The following season, Odhiambo was part of the side that secured promotion to the Football League for the first time in the club's history.

He was released at the end of the season, and subsequently joined Newport County, spending the 2009–10 season with the club, before moving to another Conference Premier team in the form of Gateshead. He spent one year at Gateshead, but was released in April 2012. A month later, Odhiambo signed for Brackley Town of the Conference North. He spent four years at Brackley before signing for Oxford City for the 2016–17 season. Odhiambo spent time at Kidlington in 2016 before joining Banbury United for the remainder of the season. He re-joined Kidlington as a player-coach for the 2017–18 campaign before then signing with Banbury for a second time, once again in a player-coach role.

Career

Early career
Odhiambo started his career as a schoolboy with Oxford United, before later becoming a trainee with Southampton. He played in the same youth team as Theo Walcott and Dexter Blackstock, but did not break into the first-team. He joined League Two club Chester City on loan in December 2004, playing in one game, a 3–1 win away to Halifax Town in the FA Cup. He returned to his parent club in early 2005, and continued to play for the club's reserve team for the remainder of the 2004–05 season.

During the early months of the following campaign, he was loaned out to Yeovil Town, although did not make any first-team appearances for the club, playing in one reserve match before returning to Southampton at the end of the brief loan agreement. In November 2005, Odhiambo joined Conference National club Tamworth on a three-month loan deal. He made his debut for the club in a 2–1 away victory over Canvey Island on 19 November 2005, playing the whole match. He went on to start in all eleven games during his loan spell; eight in the league and three in the FA Cup, as Tamworth took Stoke City to a replay, which they ultimately lost 5–4 on penalties. He saw out the remainder of the campaign back at Southampton.

Oxford United

In July 2006, Odhiambo signed for Oxford United, the club he started his football career with, on a permanent basis following the club's relegation from League Two to the Conference National. On signing for Oxford, Odhiambo stated — "Having played at Tamworth last season I know I can play at this level and hopefully above that with Oxford in the future". Following a pre-season that involved marking Cristiano Ronaldo in a friendly against Manchester United at the Kassam Stadium, he made his competitive debut for Oxford in a 2–0 home win over Halifax Town on the opening day of the 2006–07 season. He played regularly in the side throughout the campaign, scoring his first goal for the club in a 1–1 home draw against Cambridge United on 3 February 2007. He went on to score two further times that season; in convincing away victories against his former club, Tamworth, as well as in a 3–0 win against Altrincham on 17 March 2007. He made 47 appearances in all competitions during the season, as Oxford missed out on an immediate return to the Football League after losing to Exeter City in the play-off semi-finals.

Odhiambo remained at Oxford for the 2007–08 season, playing in the club's first game of the new season, a 1–0 home win against Forest Green Rovers. His season was disrupted by injury, missing two months of the campaign after sustaining knee ligament damage in a 1–1 draw with York City on 30 September 2007. He returned to first-team action on 10 November 2007, coming on as a 64th-minute substitute and scoring Oxford's third goal in a 3–1 victory over Northwich Victoria; "providing an expert finishing touch at the far post" to wrap up the win. Odhiambo remained a regular for the remainder of the campaign, making 34 appearances, and scoring once more; the only goal of the game in Oxford's 1–0 win against York City at Bootham Crescent on 15 April 2008, to double his goal tally for the season. During his time at Oxford, he made 81 appearances in all competitions, scoring on five occasions.

Stevenage Borough
He was offered a new contract by Oxford at the end of the 2007–08 season, but left to join Stevenage Borough on 14 May 2008. Oxford were owed compensation for the player due to his age. He stated – "It was a hard decision, but I'm going to stick by it. I don't know the reception I'll get in Oxford, but a move should benefit me". Odhiambo made his debut for the Hertfordshire club on the first day of the season in a 5–0 defeat away at Wrexham, a game in which he featured at right-midfield, as opposed to his usual role of full-back. He continued to play regularly throughout the first half of Stevenage's league campaign, scoring his first goal on 12 October 2008 in a 2–1 defeat away to Eastbourne Borough. He struggled to hold down a first-team place from November onwards; featuring in only two league games in four months. His last appearance of the season came at Wembley Stadium, coming on as an 85th-minute substitute in Stevenage's 2–0 victory against York City in the FA Trophy final. He 21 appearances during the 2008–09 season, scoring once.

At the start of Stevenage's 2009–10 campaign, Odhiambo again struggled for first-team appearances. He made his first start of the season on 31 August 2009, coming on as a substitute in a game against Histon; and scored the second goal in a 2–0 victory. Odhiambo started playing on a more regular basis; assisting goals in wins against Mansfield Town, Luton Town, and Eastbourne Borough respectively. He scored his second goal of the season in a 3–0 win over AFC Wimbledon on 5 April 2010. Odhiambo 21 times during the season, scoring twice, as Stevenage won promotion to the Football League for the first time in the club's history, finishing the season as league champions. He was released by Stevenage at the end of the season. During his two years with the club, he played 41 times and scored three goals.

Newport County
Ahead of the 2010–11 season, Odhiambo signed for Conference Premier club Newport County on a free transfer. He made his debut on the first day of the season in a 1–0 defeat away at Darlington on 14 August 2010, playing the whole match. He featured regularly as both a right-back and in central midfield during the campaign, playing 36 times as Newport secured a mid-table finish. His final game for the club was in a 7–1 away victory over Gateshead in the last game of the season on 30 April 2011. Despite playing regularly during his one season at Newport, he was released by the South Wales side in May 2011.

Gateshead
Following his release from Newport County, Odhiambo signed for fellow Conference Premier club Gateshead in June 2011. He joined the club on a free transfer, and on a one-year contract. He signed for Gateshead alongside striker Yemi Odubade, with the pair also having played together at Oxford United, Stevenage, and Newport. On signing Odhiambo, Gateshead manager Ian Bogie stated – "Eddie was outstanding as a marauding right-back against us for Newport on the last day of the season and another string to his bow is that he can cover in the central midfield areas, right midfield and at left back". Odhiambo made his Gateshead debut on 13 August in a 3–2 win over Kidderminster Harriers at Aggborough. He made 29 appearances in all competitions during the campaign, as Gateshead finished the season in eighth place in the league. Odhiambo was released by Gateshead on 30 April 2012.

Brackley Town
Odhiambo signed for Conference North club Brackley Town for the 2012–13 season, making his debut on 18 August 2012 in a 4–1 win against Altrincham. He scored his first goal for Brackley three days later in a 5–0 win against Hinckley United. The goal was Odhiambo's first in nearly two-and-a-half years. He was almost ever-present during the campaign, making 46 appearances in all competitions as Brackley finished the season positioned in third place in the Conference North table. He played in all three of the club's play-off matches that season, as they were defeated 1–0 to FC Halifax Town in the final on 12 May 2013. At the end of the season, Odhiambo was voted as the club's Player of the Year.

North Leigh
On 5 June 2020 Southern League Division One Central side North Leigh confirmed the signing of Odhiambo in a player-coach capacity. In March 2021 he was appointed manager of the club and retired from playing. On 14 November 2022, Odhiambo departed the club by mutual consent.

Personal life
He has two brothers who are footballers, Eric Odhiambo is a professional footballer playing for League of Ireland side Sligo Rovers, and Anaclet Odhiambo is also a semi-professional footballer who has played for Abingdon United.

In June 2009, he announced that he would go by his father's surname, Odhiambo. He had previously been known as Eddie Anaclet.

Career statistics

A.  The "League" column constitutes appearances and goals (including those as a substitute) in the Football League and Football Conference.
B.  The "Other" column constitutes appearances and goals (including those as a substitute) in the FA Trophy, Football League Trophy and play-offs.

Honours
Stevenage
FA Trophy: 2008–09; runner-up: 2009–10
Conference Premier: 2009–10

Individual
 Brackley Town Player of the Year: 2012–13

References

External links

1985 births
Living people
People from Arusha District
Tanzanian footballers
Association football defenders
Chester City F.C. players
Yeovil Town F.C. players
Tamworth F.C. players
Oxford United F.C. players
Stevenage F.C. players
Gateshead F.C. players
Newport County A.F.C. players
Brackley Town F.C. players
Oxford City F.C. players
Kidlington F.C. players
Banbury United F.C. players
North Leigh F.C. players
National League (English football) players
Southern Football League players
North Leigh F.C. managers
Southern Football League managers